CleanMail may refer to:
 RM4SCC a barcode symbology used by the Royal Mail
 CleanMail Antispam an antispam filter software from Byteplant, available in freeware and commercial editions.